No. 604 Squadron RAF was a squadron of the Royal Air Force noted for its pioneering role the development of radar-controlled night-fighter operations. The squadron was established in March 1930 at RAF Hendon as a day-bomber squadron of the Royal Auxiliary Air Force. In July 1934, the squadron transitioned to two-seat fighters. Shortly after the commencement of World War II in 1939, the squadron was reassigned to a night-fighter role.

No. 604 Squadron was initially disbanded in April 1945 as part of a reduction of the British Armed Forces near the end of the war. It was reformed as an auxiliary single-seat fighter squadron in May 1946, again at RAF Hendon. Final disbandment occurred in March 1957 with the dissolution of the Auxiliary Air Force.

History

Formation and early years
No. 604 Squadron was established on 17 March 1930 at RAF Hendon as a squadron of the Royal Auxiliary Air Force. The squadron was initially assigned to the role of day-bombing and received its first aircraft (Airco DH.9As) in April 1930. The DH.9A was soon replaced by the Westland Wapiti in September 1930. Upon re-designation as a two-seat fighter squadron, No. 604 transitioned to the Hawker Hart on 23 July 1934. Hawker Demons replaced the Harts in June 1935.

World War II
In early 1939 the squadron transitioned to the long-range fighter variant of the Bristol Blenheim. No. 604 Squadron was activated on 24 August 1939 to operate long-range fighters from RAF North Weald. The squadron spent the first several months of World War II flying defensive patrols in support of coastal convoys.

The squadron was reassigned to a night-fighter role in late 1939 and was relocated to RAF Northolt in January 1940. By May 1940, the squadron had moved to RAF Manston. During the squadron's stay at RAF Manston that Flying Officer Alistair Hunter and Sergeant Gordon Thomas shot down a Luftwaffe Heinkel 115 floatplane shortly after midnight on 18 June 1940, during the first major night raid over the United Kingdom.  Following the Dunkirk evacuation, the squadron was based at RAF Middle Wallop at the end of July 1940.

In early summer 1940, squadron aircraft were fitted with VHF radiotelephone equipment and Mark III Airborne interception (AI) radar. The former was part of RAF Fighter Command policy, and greatly improved air-to-air and air-to ground communication. The AI equipment was fitted to assist the night fighter crews in locating German bombers at night. A new technological development, AI was not particularly reliable at this stage, and needed a third crew member to operate. The external antennas slowed down aircraft that were already considered of low performance for their role. Most AI operators were inexperienced and were forced to learn on the job, translating the information provided on the AI screens into instructions to enable their pilot to get close enough to visually locate and shoot down an enemy bomber.

Late in September 1940 the squadron received its first Bristol Beaufighter, equipped with four 20-mm Hispano-Suiza HS.404 cannon under the nose and improved Mark IV AI radio-location equipment. As one of the few squadrons thus equipped, 604 Squadron provided night defence over the UK during the Blitz from late 1940 until mid May 1941, when most Luftwaffe bomber units departed for involvement in the invasion of Russia. By this time 50 air victories had been claimed by the squadron—fourteen by F/L John Cunningham.

In early 1943 the squadron began to switch over to night intruder operations. In February 1944, the squadron was allocated to the 2nd Tactical Air Force and began conversion to the de Havilland Mosquito. Operations from Normandy began in August but the following month the unit returned to the UK, returning to the continent once again in January 1945. They remained there until disbanding at B.51 at Vendeville, near Lille, France, on 18 April 1945. Some 127 air victories had been claimed by the Squadron during the war, 41 since May 1944. A notable member of the squadron, later awarded a posthumous George Cross, was John Quinton DFC.

Post-war
With the reactivation of the Royal Auxiliary Air Force, 604 Squadron was reformed on 10 May 1946 at RAF Hendon as a day fighter squadron. It was initially equipped with Spitfire LF.16s but converted to jets in November 1949 when de Havilland Vampires arrived. These were replaced by Gloster Meteors in August 1952 but this was only for a few years as the squadron was disbanded on 10 March 1957, along with all the flying units of the Royal Auxiliary Air Force.

Aircraft operated

Squadron bases

Commanding officers

References

Notes

Bibliography

Further reading

External links

 604 Squadron history on RAF website 
 Squadron histories for nos. 600–604 sqn on RAFweb
 604 in the Battle of Britain
 Traces of World War 2: RAF – No. 604 Squadron

604 Squadron
Aircraft squadrons of the Royal Air Force in World War II
RAF squadrons involved in the Battle of Britain
Military units and formations established in 1930